Algaze is a surname. Notable people with the surname include:

 Guillermo Algaze (born 1954), Cuban anthropologist
 Mario Algaze (born 1947), Cuban-American photographer